The 1952 Monaco Grand Prix was a non-championship sports car race held on June 2, 1952, at Monaco.

For the second time in two races, the Grand Prix suffered a multi-car pileup. In addition, it was marred by Luigi Fagioli's accident in practice, which ultimately proved fatal.

Entries

Classification

Race

References 
Race result taken from 

 Kettlewell, Mike. "Monaco: Road Racing on the Riviera", in Northey, Tom, editor. World of Automobiles'', Volume 12, pp. 1381-4. London: Orbis, 1974.

Monaco Grand Prix
Grand Prix
Monaco Grand Prix